The Mark Twain Readers Award, or simply Mark Twain Award, is a children's book award which annually recognizes one book selected by vote of Missouri schoolchildren from a list prepared by librarians and volunteer readers. It is now one of four Missouri Association of School Librarians (MASL) Readers Awards and is associated with school grades 4 to 6; the other MASL Readers Awards were inaugurated from 1995 to 2009 and are associated with grades K–3, 6–8, 9–12 and nonfiction. The 1970 Newbery Medal winning book Sounder, by William H. Armstrong, was the inaugural winner of the Mark Twain Award in 1972. 

Peg Kehret has won the Mark Twain Award four times, once in 1999 for Small Steps: The Year I Got Polio, a memoir of her childhood, and three times in six years from 2007 to 2012 for novels.

Nomination guidelines 
 Books should interest children in grades four through six.
 Books should be an original work written by an author living in the United States.
 Books should be of literary value which may enrich children's personal lives.
 Books should be published two years prior to nomination on a master list of twelve nominees.

Voting process 
Though the list of nominated books is designated for grades four through six, any student can vote for the winner so long as they satisfy the following criteria:

 Book must have been read by voter.
 Voter must have read at least four books from the list of nominees.
 Voter can only vote once.

Schools design their own ballots. Individual votes for each school (or qualified group) are tallied on a single sheet and submitted to the MASL.

Winners 

The award has recognized a single book by a single writer without exception from 1972.

 2021 Blended by Sharon Draper
 2020 One for Sorrow: a Ghost Story by Mary Downing Hahn
 2019 Framed! by James Ponti
 2018 The War That Saved My Life by Kimberly Brubaker Bradley
 2017 A Million Ways Home by Dianna Dorisi-Winget
 2016 Escape from Mr. Lemoncello's Library by Chris Grabenstein
 2015 Wonder by R.J. Palacio
 2014 The Unwanteds by Lisa McMann
 2013 Out of My Mind by Sharon Draper 
 2012 Runaway Twin by Peg Kehret
 2011 Stolen Children by Peg Kehret
 2010 Deep and Dark and Dangerous by Mary Downing Hahn 
 2009 The Sea of Monsters by Rick Riordan
 2008 The Lightning Thief by Rick Riordan
 2007 Abduction! by Peg Kehret
 2006 The City of Ember by Jeanne DuPrau
 2005 Wenny Has Wings by Janet Lee Carey (made into a Japanese movie Ano sora wo Oboetaru)
 2004 Zach's Lie by Roland Smith
 2003 Because of Winn-Dixie by Kate DiCamillo
 2002 Dork In Disguise by Carol Gorman
 2001 Holes by Louis Sachar
 2000 Saving Shiloh by Phyllis Naylor
 1999 Small Steps: The Year I Got Polio by Peg Kehret
 1998 Titanic Crossing by Barbara Williams
 1997 Time for Andrew by Mary Downing Hahn
 1996 Ghosts of Mercy Manor by Betty Ren Wright
 1995 The Man Who Loved Clowns by June Rae Wood
 1994 Shiloh by Phyllis Naylor
 1993 Maniac Magee by Jerry Spinelli
 1992 The Doll in the Garden: A Ghost Story by Mary Downing Hahn
 1991 All About Sam by Lois Lowry
 1990 There's a Boy in the Girls' Bathroom by Louis Sachar
 1989 Sixth-Grade Sleepover by Eve Bunting
 1988 Baby-Sitting Is a Dangerous Job by Willo Davis Roberts
 1987 The War with Grandpa by Robert Kimmel Smith
 1986 The Dollhouse Murders by Betty Ren Wright
 1985 A Bundle of Sticks by Pat Rhoads Mauser
 1984 The Secret Life of the Underwear Champ by Betty Miles 
 1983 The Girl with the Silver Eyes by Willo Davis Roberts
 1982 The Boy Who Saw Bigfoot by Marian Place
 1981 Soup for President by Robert Newton Peck
 1980 Pinballs by Betsy Byars
 1979 Champion of Merrimack County by Roger W. Drury 
 1978 Ramona the Brave by Beverly Cleary
 1977 The Ghost of Saturday Night by Sid Fleischman
 1976 The Home Run Trick by Scott Corbett
 1975 How to Eat Fried Worms by Thomas Rockwell
 1974 It's a Mile from Here to Glory by Robert C. Lee 
 1973 Mrs. Frisby and the Rats of NIMH by Robert C. O'Brien
 1972 Sounder by William H. Armstrong

See also
 
 1971–1972 Mark Twain Awards nominees
 1972–1973 Mark Twain Awards nominees

References

External links 
 Mark Twain Award winners 1972–  booklist at WorldCat
 The MASL Readers Awards – point of entry to all four Missouri School Librarians reader choice book awards

Mark Twain Awards
American children's literary awards
Awards established in 1972
Missouri culture
Missouri education-related lists